Karkhana may refer to:
Karkhana, Bangladesh
 Karkhana, Secunderabad, India